Informationised war (informatised war) is a combination of and evolution in warfare from pre-existing ones such as network-centric, cyber, psychological, electronic and information warfare, and integrating all the "opportunities and technologies provided by the Information Age" into all domains, systems and aspects of modern warfare. China's Defense White Papers of 2004, 2006, 2015, and 2019 all emphasis and discuss "informationization" of its military; the country aims for a fully "informationised" force by 2049.

Notes

References

Further reading 

 S. Erickson, Conor M. Kennedy. China’s Maritime Militia Andrew CNA
 Informatised War. Journal of Information Warfare.

Warfare by type